Miroslav Káčer (born 2 February 1996) is a Slovak professional footballer who currently plays DAC Dunajská Streda on loan from Viktoria Plzeň in the Czech First League.

Club career

MŠK Žilina
Káčer began his football career at his hometown club MŠK Žilina. Aged 16, Miroslav made his debut for Žilina against Spartak Myjava on 13 July 2012. On his competition debut, he scored his first professional goal in a 4–1 win.

Káčer was released from Žilina, as the club had entered liquidation, due to a coronavirus pandemic.

Viktoria Plzeň
On 6 May 2020 it had been announced that Káčer had signed for Viktoria Plzeň, along with Filip Kaša, who was also released from Žilina. They had re-joined their former coach from the Slovak club, Adrián Guľa, under whom they had won the Slovak Fortuna Liga in the 2016–17 season. The terms of his agreement with Viktoria were not announced.

International career
Káčer was called up for two unofficial friendly fixtures held in Abu Dhabi, UAE, in January 2017, against Uganda and Sweden. He capped his debut against Uganda, when he was fielded in the 70th minute, when he substituted Roman Gergel. Slovakia went on to lose the game 1–3. He also appeared in the second match against Sweden, playing the first hour of the match, which Slovakia lost 0–6, before being substituted by Gergel.

Honours

MŠK Žilina
Fortuna Liga: Winners: 2016-17

Viktoria Plzeň
Fortuna:Liga: Winners: 2021-22

References

External links
MŠK Žilina profile

1996 births
Living people
Sportspeople from Žilina
Slovak footballers
Slovak expatriate footballers
Slovakia youth international footballers
Association football midfielders
MŠK Žilina players
FC DAC 1904 Dunajská Streda players
Slovak Super Liga players
FC Viktoria Plzeň players
Czech First League players
Expatriate footballers in the Czech Republic
Slovak expatriate sportspeople in the Czech Republic
Slovakia under-21 international footballers